Davis–Beard House, also known as Glee Hall and Davis House, is a historic home located at Bristow, Prince William County, Virginia. It was built after the American Civil War, and is a two-story, five bay, frame I-house dwelling with later additions. The rambling dwelling has a number of Late Victorian style decorative elements.  It features a one-story wraparound porch, decorated gables, bay windows, and storefront.  Also on the property are a contributing brick hip-roofed carriage house and a small lattice-covered frame privy.

It was listed on the National Register of Historic Places in 1989.

References

Houses on the National Register of Historic Places in Virginia
Victorian architecture in Virginia
Houses in Prince William County, Virginia
National Register of Historic Places in Prince William County, Virginia